Choc Bay is a bay in Gros Islet Quarter on the island nation of Saint Lucia; it is along the northwestern coast of the island.  The Choc River flows into the bay.

History
Francis Willoughby, 5th Baron Willoughby of Parham's expedition built a fort overlooking the bay in 1664, but it was abandoned in 1666.  The French then built a fort here in 1667.

See also
List of rivers of Saint Lucia

References

Bays of Saint Lucia